William Franklin Dunbar (November 8, 1820 – April 28, 1890) was an American politician.

Born in Westerly, Rhode Island, he moved to Caledonia, Minnesota in 1854 and was a farmer. He served in the Minnesota Territorial House of Representatives in 1856-1857. From 1858-1861, Dunbar served as the first Minnesota State Auditor.

Dunbar died on April 28, 1890. He is buried in Evergreen Cemetery in Houston, Minnesota.

Notes

1820 births
1890 deaths
People from Westerly, Rhode Island
People from Caledonia, Minnesota
Members of the Minnesota Territorial Legislature
State Auditors of Minnesota
19th-century American politicians